Baljivac  is a village in the municipality of Ravno, Bosnia and Herzegovina.

Demographics 
According to the 2013 census, its population was 17, all Serbs.

References

Populated places in Ravno, Bosnia and Herzegovina